Brig. Gen. Abu Al-Yamamah Munir Mahmoud Ahmed Mashali Al Yafi (1974 in Yafa'a District, Lahij Governorate, Yemen – 1 August 2019) was a Yemeni support forces commander. He was the leader of the Southern Movement's military arm during the Yemeni Civil War until his death. He was assassinated on 1 August 2019 alongside 35 other people, during a drone and ballistic missile attack on a military parade in Aden, Yemen carried out by the Houthis.

References

2019 deaths
Yemeni political people
People murdered in Yemen
Place of birth missing
Deaths by explosive device
1974 births
Yemeni military personnel killed in the Yemeni Civil War (2014–present)
People from Lahij Governorate